Under the Tray..., also known as Inside the Dust Sleeve... is the third studio album by American rock band Reggie and the Full Effect.

Background
Under the Tray was written and recorded in the years following the band's previous release Promotional Copy, mostly while James Dewees was on tour with The Get Up Kids. The album was released on Vagrant Records in February 2003. The album sold rather well, reaching  15 on the Billboard Heatseekers chart and No. 8 on the Billboard Independent Albums chart. The song "Congratulations Smack and Katy" was featured in the video game Burnout 3: Takedown.

Packaging
Under the Tray is named as such because the packaging contained an opaque black tray made to hold a CD. However, the discs were packed underneath the tray, giving the appearance upon opening that there was no disc in the package, prompting numerous complaints with retailers carrying the album. Later pressings included an illustration showing where the CD is.

The vinyl pressing of this album is titled Inside the Dust Sleeve...

Track listing

Personnel
James Dewees – vocals, keyboard, drums
Matt Pryor – guitar, backup vocals
Rob Pope – bass guitar
Ed Rose – production, mixing

Additional Personnel
 Andy Jackson – vocals on "Happy V-Day"

Chart positions

References

2003 albums
Reggie and the Full Effect albums
Albums produced by Ed Rose